Jose Vega (born September 9, 1985) is an American mixed martial artist currently competing in the bantamweight division. A professional competitor since 2008, Vega has formerly competed for Bellator Fighting Championships and Titan Fighting Championship.

Mixed martial arts career

Bellator Fighting Championships
After going 7–3 in smaller promotions, Vega signed with Bellator. He made his debut for the promotion at Bellator 22 on June 17, 2010 against Jarrod Card. He was victorious via a first-round knockout, which earned him a spot in the Bellator season 3 bantamweight tournament.

Vega faced Danny Tims in the quarterfinals at Bellator 26 on August 26, 2010. He won the fight via unanimous decision. In the semifinals, Vega faced Ed West at Bellator 30 on September 23, 2010. He lost the fight via split decision.

Vega faced Chase Beebe in a Bellator season 5 bantamweight tournament qualifier bout at Bellator 43 on May 7, 2011. He lost the fight via guillotine choke submission in the first round.

Titan Fighting Championship
Vega faced Andrew Whitney at Titan Fighting Championship 22 on May 25, 2012. He lost the fight via knockout in the first round, which marked the first knockout loss of his professional career.

Vega faced Adam Stickey at Titan Fighting Championship 24 on August 24, 2012. He was defeated via triangle choke submission in the first round, suffering his fourth consecutive loss in the process.

Mixed martial arts record

|-
|Loss
|align=center|9–7
|Adam Stickey
|Submission (triangle choke)
|Titan Fighting Championship 24
|
|align=center|1
|align=center|3:23
|Kansas City, Kansas, United States
|
|-
|Loss
|align=center|9–6
|Andrew Whitney
|KO (punches)
|Titan Fighting Championship 22
|
|align=center|1
|align=center|2:55
|Kansas City, Kansas, United States
|
|-
|Loss
|align=center|9–5
|Chase Beebe
|Submission (guillotine choke)
|Bellator 43
|
|align=center|1
|align=center|4:06
|Newkirk, Oklahoma, United States
|
|-
|Loss
|align=center|9–4
|Ed West
|Decision (split)
|Bellator 30
|
|align=center|3
|align=center|5:00
|Louisville, Kentucky, United States
|
|-
|Win
|align=center|9–3
|Danny Tims
|Decision (unanimous)
|Bellator 26
|
|align=center|3
|align=center|5:00
|Kansas City, Missouri, United States
|
|-
|Win
|align=center|8–3
|Jarrod Card
|KO (punch)
|Bellator 22
|
|align=center|1
|align=center|0:39
|Kansas City, Missouri, United States
|
|-
|Loss
|align=center|7–3
|Jeremy Spoon
|Submission
|Bricktown Brawl 4
|
|align=center|2
|align=center|4:42
|Oklahoma City, Oklahoma, United States
|
|-
|Loss
|align=center|7–2
|Tommy Lee
|Decision (unanimous)
|PB MMA: Live Saturday Night
|
|align=center|3
|align=center|5:00
|Springdale, Arkansas, United States
|
|-
|Win
|align=center|7–1
|Larry DiGiulio
|Submission (triangle choke)
|First Blood
|
|align=center|2
|align=center|2:57
|Lake Ozark, Missouri, United States
|
|-
|Loss
|align=center|6–1
|Josh Rave
|Submission (armbar)
|Fuel Fight Club
|
|align=center|3
|align=center|1:53
|Lake Ozark, Missouri, United States
|
|-
|Win
|align=center|6–0
|Kevin Croom
|Submission
|Hulett Productions: First Blood
|
|align=center|2
|align=center|2:22
|Sedalia, Missouri, United States
|
|-
|Win
|align=center|5–0
|Cody Bell
|Submission
|XF: X-Treme Fight 1
|
|align=center|2
|align=center|4:30
|Kansas City, Missouri, United States
|
|-
|Win
|align=center|4–0
|Carson Gainey
|Submission (rear-naked choke)
|MMA Big Show: Relentless
|
|align=center|1
|align=center|2:27
|Covington, Kentucky, United States
|
|-
|Win
|align=center|3–0
|Danny Tims
|Submission
|IFC: Sturgis 2008
|
|align=center|2
|align=center|3:00
|Sturgis, South Dakota, United States
|
|-
|Win
|align=center|2–0
|Eric Buck
|Submission (rear-naked choke)
|IFC: Sturgis 2008
|
|align=center|1
|align=center|4:50
|Sturgis, South Dakota, United States
|
|-
|Win
|align=center|1–0
|Chris Journigan
|Submission (hammerlock)
|IFC: Sturgis 2008
|
|align=center|1
|align=center|1:40
|Sturgis, South Dakota, United States
|

References

Living people
1985 births
American male mixed martial artists
Bantamweight mixed martial artists
Sportspeople from Miami
People from Johnson County, Missouri